Albumraveh Shamkoli (also Romanized as Ālbūmraveḥ Shamḵolī; also known as Albamrāveh, Al Bamrūḩ Shaljeh, and Albomāveh) is a village in Karkheh Rural District, Hamidiyeh District, Ahvaz County, Khuzestan Province, Iran. At the 2006 census, its population was 288, in 44 families.

References 

Populated places in Ahvaz County